Mumbaki is a 1996 Philippine action drama film co-written and directed by Butch Perez. The film stars Raymart Santiago and Albert Martinez.

Plot
Dr. Joseph Dumalilon (Raymart) returns to his hometown in Ifugao, along with his girlfriend Nancy (Rachel), to attend the funeral of his father Apo Ginoldang (Ray), a tribal healer and leader who was killed in a tribal conflict, and to treat patients in an ongoing cholera epidemic, during which he makes friends with Felix (Joel), the community doctor. However, his fellow tribespeople demand that he avenge his father's death by killing members of the tribe that killed his father, something that he refuses to do because of his duty to the Hippocratic Oath and his willingness to treat members of the enemy tribe headed by Ramon (Pen).

Cast
 Raymart Santiago as Dr. Joseph Dumalilon
 Albert Martinez as Carlos Bakayyawan
 Joel Torre as Dr. Felix Lorenzo
 Rachel Alejandro as Dr. Nancy Madrid
 Ruby Moreno as Aya Imaya
 Ace Espinosa as Daniel Atiwan
 Angel Aquino as Dolores
 Ray Ventura as Apo Ginoldang
 Pen Medina as Ramon Atiwan
 Edward Vergara as Jimmy Dumalilon
 Joe Gruta as Apo Dangunay
 Rolando Tinio as Ngidulu
 Randy David as Ngidulu's Assistant
 Rudy Borromeo as Peacetalk Mediator
 Angelo Suarez as Lando
 Emilio Rodrigo as Anaban

References

External links

1996 films
1996 action films
Filipino-language films
Philippine action drama films
Neo Films films
Films set in Ifugao